The Apocryphon of John, also called the Secret Book of John or the Secret Revelation of John, is a 2nd-century Sethian Gnostic Christian pseudepigraphical text attributed to John the Apostle. It is one of the texts addressed by Irenaeus in his Against Heresies, placing its composition before 180 CE. It is presented as describing Jesus appearing and giving secret knowledge (gnosis) to his disciple John. The author describes it as having occurred after Jesus had "gone back to the place from which he came".

Overview
Many second-century Christians, both Gnostic and orthodox, hoped to receive a transcendent personal revelation such as Paul the Apostle reported to the church at Corinth or that John experienced on the isle of Patmos, which inspired the Book of Revelation. As Acts narrates what happened after the time Jesus ascended to heaven, so the Apocryphon of John begins at the same point but relates how Christ reappeared to John.

The opening words of the Secret Book of John are, "The teaching of the saviour, and the revelation of the mysteries and the things hidden in silence, even these things which he taught John, his disciple." The author John is immediately specified as "John, the brother of James—who are the sons of Zebedee." The remainder of the book is a vision of spiritual realms and of the prior history of spiritual humanity.

There are four separate surviving manuscripts of "The Secret Book of John".  One was purchased in Egypt in 1896 (the Berlin Codex) and three were found in the Nag Hammadi codices discovered in 1945.  All date to the 4th century and are Coptic translations from Greek. Three appear to have been independently produced. Two of the four are similar enough that they probably were copied from a single source.  

Although the different versions of the texts have minor variants (the Berlin Codex has many minor differences with Nag Hammadi II and IV), all texts generally agree on the assertion that the main revealing entity was Jesus.

History
A book called the Apocryphon of John was referred to by Irenaeus in Adversus Haereses, written about 185, among "an indescribable number of secret and illegitimate writings, which they themselves have forged, to bewilder the minds of foolish people, who are ignorant of the true scriptures"—scriptures which Irenaeus himself helped to establish (see the canonical four). Among the writings he quotes from, in order to expose and refute them, are the Gospel of Truth, Gospel of Judas, and this secret book of John. 

Little more was known of this text until 1945, when a cache of thirteen papyrus codices (bound books) that had been hidden away in the 4th century, was fortuitously discovered at Nag Hammadi in Egypt (CG II). The Apocryphon of John was among the texts, in three Coptic versions translated from the Greek. Two of the versions are very similar and represent one manuscript tradition; they incorporate a lengthy excerpt from a certain Book of Zoroaster appended to the Apocryphon (as chapters 15:29 – 19:8f) A shorter version of the Apocryphon found at Nag Hammadi does not contain the interpolation and represents another manuscript tradition. Still another version of this short edition of the text was discovered in an ancient Coptic Codex acquired by Dr. Carl Reinhardt in Cairo in 1896. This manuscript (identified as the "Berlin Gnostic Codex" or BG 8502) was used along with the three versions found at Nag Hammadi to produce the translations now available.  The fact that four manuscript "editions" of this text survived—two "long" versions and two "short" versions—suggests how important this text was in early gnostic Christian circles. In the three Nag Hammadi codices the Apocryphon of John appears always in the first version.

Influence
The Apocryphon, set in the framing device of a revelation delivered by the resurrected Christ to John the son of Zebedee, contains some of the most extensive detailing of classic dualistic Gnostic mythology that has survived; as one of the principal texts of the Nag Hammadi library, it is an essential text of study for anyone interested in Gnosticism. Frederick Wisse, who translated it, asserts that "The Apocryphon of John was still used in the eighth century by the Audians of Mesopotamia" (Wisse p 104).

The Apocryphon of John has become the central text for studying the gnostic tradition of Antiquity. The creation mythology it details has been studied by Carl Jung and Eric Voegelin.

Texts

There are currently four surviving copies of The Secret Revelation of John. They are largely the same in their basic structure and content. One notable difference between the codices is their individual length. The Berlin Codex and Nag Hammadi Codex III are shorter than the Nag Hammadi Codices I and II.  Another  point of departure between codices is the portrayal of the Savior/Christ figure. The Berlin Codex generally uses the term “Christ” more frequently, whereas the Nag Hammadi Codex III narrative often substitutes the term “Lord” or “Savior”. However, the Nag Hammadi Codex III closes its text with the prayer “Jesus Christ, Amen.” An additional distinction, with regards to the Christian framing of the texts, is that Nag Hammadi Codex III goes into greater detail about the descent of the Christ/Savior figure into the prison-world of Demiurge and his role in facilitating the reawakening and liberation of mankind. These distinctions may represent a certain degree of variation in the way that Gnostic cosmology was woven into a Christian context.

Summary of the text and its cosmology

The following summary of the Apocryphon is derived from Wisse's translation.

The text begins with John describing his own state of grief and bewilderment after Christ's crucifixion. The Savior then appears, takes various forms, and after banishing John's fears, provides the following cosmological narrative.

The highest divine principle is the Monad. The Monad is described as a "monarchy with nothing above it". He is supreme, absolute, eternal, infinite, perfect, holy and self-sufficient. However, his transcendent ineffability is also emphasized. He is neither quantifiable nor can his qualities ever truly be described. The Monad exists in inconceivable perfection.

The Monad produces from his thought a feminine divine entity or principle named Barbelo. She is described as "the first thought", and the "image" of the Monad. While Barbelo is always referred to as a "she", she is also described as both the primordial mother and father. She is also regarded as "the first man", "Holy Spirit", "Mother/Father" and described in various terms of androgyny. She is the first of a class of beings referred to as the Aeons, and an exchange between herself and the Monad brings the other Aeons into being. Additionally, the properties of Light and Mind are born from the Monad's reflection on Barbelo. Light is synonymous with Christ, also called "Christ the Autogenes". The Light and the Mind engage in further creative activity, aided by and glorifying the superior principles of Barbelo and the Monad. Together, they bring forth further Aeons and powers. 

Eventually, one of the Aeons, Sophia "of the Epinoia", disrupts the harmony of these processes by engaging in creative activity without the participation or consent of the Spirit of the Monad and without the aid of a male consort. The creative power of her thought produces an entity named Yaltabaoth, who is the first of a series of incomplete, demonic entities called the Archons. Yaltabaoth, whose character is malevolent and arrogant, also has a grotesque form. His head is that of a lion while he possesses a serpentine body. Recognizing the deformed, imperfect nature of her offspring, Sophia attempts to conceal it somewhere where the other Aeons will not discover it. The act of hiding Yaltabaoth also has the result that Yaltabaoth himself remains ignorant of the upper world and the other Aeons.

Despite the fact that Yaltabaoth possesses only a single parent and was created without the consent of the Spirit of the Monad, he is powerful enough to mimic the creative processes of the superior Aeons. He creates a whole host of other Archons, each of whom share his own basically deficient character, and creates a world for them to inhabit. This world is fundamentally inferior to the world above. It is fashioned out of darkness, but animated by light stolen from Sophia. The result is a world that is neither "light nor dark" but is instead "dim". In his arrogance and ignorance, Yaltabaoth declares himself the sole and jealous God of this realm.

Recognizing the imperfection of Yaltabaoth and his counterfeit world, Sophia repents. In forgiveness of her error, the Spirit of the Monad assists the other Aeons and powers in an attempt to redeem Sophia and her bastard creation. During this process Yaltabaoth and his Archons hear the voice of the Monad's Spirit. While they are terrified by the voice, its echo leaves a trace of an image of the Spirit on the "waters" that form the roof of their realm. Hoping to harness this power for themselves, they attempt to create a copy of this image. The end result of this process is the first human man, Adam.

Recognizing an opportunity to retrieve the light imprisoned in the darkness of Yaltabaoth and his world, Sophia and agents of the higher order, referred to variously as the "plenoria" or the "Epinoia", and later as the "pleroma",  devise a scheme. They trick Yaltabaoth into blowing his own spiritual essence into Adam. This simultaneously animates Adam and empties Yaltabaoth of the portion of his being derived from Sophia. 

Seeing the luminosity, intelligence and general superiority of the now animate Adam, Yaltabaoth and the Archons regret their creation and do their best to imprison or dispose of him. Failing to do so, they then attempt to neutralize him by placing him in the Garden of Eden. In this narrative, the Garden of Eden is a false paradise where the fruit of the trees is sin, lust, ignorance, confinement and death. While they give Adam access to the Tree of Life, they conceal the Tree of Knowledge of Good and Evil. According to this narrative, the Tree of Knowledge actually represents the penetration of the positive forces of the higher world and the Epinoia into Yaltabaoth's realm.

At this point in the narrative, Christ reveals to John that it was he who caused Adam to consume the fruit of the Tree of Knowledge. Additionally, it is revealed that Eve is a helper sent by agents of the higher order to help liberate the light imprisoned in Yaltabaoth's creation and in Adam. She is created when Yaltabaoth attempts to draw the light out of Adam. This results in the creation of the female body. When Adam perceives her, he sees a reflection of his own essence and is freed from the bewitching power of Yaltabaoth.

The narrative then details Yaltabaoth's attempts to regain control over the essence of Light. His primary scheme is to initiate the activity of human reproduction, by which he hopes to create new human bodies inhabited by a counterfeit spirit. This counterfeit spirit allows Yaltabaoth and his agents to deceive the human race, keeping them in ignorance of their true nature, and is the primary means by which Yaltabaoth keeps humanity in subjugation. It is the source of all earthly evil and confusion, and causes people to die "not having found truth and without knowing the God of truth".
 
Following this revelation, the narrative then takes the form of a series of questions and answers between John and the Savior. These address a number of subjects, but are largely soteriological in nature. John asks Christ who is eligible for salvation, and Christ responds with the answer that those who come in contact with the true Spirit will receive salvation, while those who are dominated by the counterfeit spirit will receive damnation. Christ also reveals his own role as a liberating agent of the higher realm, in this context. Christ, who describes himself as the "remembrance of the Pronoia" and "the remembrance of the pleroma", brings light into the darkness of Yaltabaoth's prison. Here, he rouses the prisoners to wakefulness and remembrance. Those who receive and are woken by Christ's revelation are raised up and “sealed… in the light of the water with five seals”. They are thus spared from death and damnation. This aspect of Christ's role is elaborated on more fully by Nag Hammadi Codex III, whereas it is omitted from the Berlin Codex.

This concludes Christ's message. Finally, the savior states that anyone who shares these revelations for personal profit will be cursed. The Nag Hammadi Codex III version of the text ends with the prayer, "Jesus Christ, Amen".

Notes

Sources
Davies, Stevan L (2006). The Secret Book of John: The Gnostic Gospel, Annotated and Explained. London: Darton Longman & Todd. 

King, Karen (2006). The Secret Revelation of John. Cambridge: Harvard UP.
Logan, Alastair H. B. 1996. Gnostic Truth and Christian Heresy. Based on the Apocryphon of John.
Pagels, Elaine, 2003. Beyond Belief.
Pearson, Birger A. (2007). Ancient Gnosticism: Traditions and Literature. Minneapolis: Fortress.
Wisse, Frederick (1996). (1996) "The Apocryphon of John (II,1, III,1 IV,1, and BG 8502, 2)." In Robinson, James M., et al., eds. The Nag Hammadi Library in English. Leiden: Brill.

Further reading

External links
The Apocryphon of John Collection (at the Gnosis Archive): A comprehensive collection of material about the Apocryphon of John, including introductory material and several translations of the text.
Early Christian Writings: Apocryphon of John
Dark Mirrors of Heaven: Gnostic Cosmogony
list of heavenly beings in the Secret Book of John

2nd-century Christian texts
 
Sethian texts
Texts in Coptic
Texts in Koine Greek
Nag Hammadi library